Kamerunoceras is an extinct  cephalopod genus belonging to the ammonite family Acanthoceratidae, found in Upper Cretaceous formations (Cenomanian to Turonian age) of Africa, Europe and North and South America.

Description
Kamerunoceras, named by R.A. Reyment in 1954, was tentatively included in the acanthoceratid subfamily Mammitinae in W.J. Arkell, et al (1957), but has since been combined with Euomphaloceras, previously of the Acanthoceratinae ibid, in the Euomphaloceratinae. Kamerunoceras is described as being very evolute with a rectangular whorl section and umbilical tubercles only in the middle growth section. Ventrolateral tubercles, found mostly throughout, are spinose. Ribs are irregular, straight at first, becoming denser and sigmoid on the outer whorl.

Species 
The following species of Kamerunoceras have been described:

 K. andinum Renz, 1982
 K. antsaronense Collignon, 1965
 K. calvertense Powell, 1963
 K. douvillei (Pervinquière, 1907)
 K. eschii (Solger, 1904)
 K. ganuzai Wiedmann, 1960
 K. inaequicostatus Wiedmann, 1960
 K. isovokyense Collignon, 1965
 K. lecointrei Collignon, 1966
 K. puebloense Cobban & Scott, 1972
 K. salmuriensis Courtiller, 1867
 K. schindewolfi Collignon, 1965
 K. tinrhertense Collignon, 1965
 K. turoniense D'Orbigny, 1850

Distribution
Fossils of Kamerunoceras have been found in Austria, Brazil, Cameroon, Colombia (La Frontera and San Rafael Formations), Egypt, France, Mexico, Nigeria, Romania, Tunisia, United States (Arizona, New Mexico, Texas, Utah), Venezuela.

References

Bibliography
 
 
 )

Further reading
 W. A. Cobben and Hook, S. C. 1983 Mid-Cretaceous (Turonian) ammonite fauna from Fence Lake area of west-central New Mexico. Memoir 41, New Mexico Bureau of Mines & Mineral Resources, Socorro NM.

Ammonitida genera
Acanthoceratidae
Cretaceous ammonites
Ammonites of Africa
Cretaceous Africa
Ammonites of Europe
Cretaceous Europe
Ammonites of North America
Cretaceous Mexico
Cretaceous United States
Ammonites of South America
Cretaceous Brazil
Cretaceous Colombia
Cretaceous Venezuela
Cenomanian genus first appearances
Turonian genus extinctions
Fossil taxa described in 1954